is a Japanese actor, best known for his role as Haruto Soma, the main character of the Kamen Rider Wizard tokusatsu series. He finished second at Junon Super Boy Contest 2007. He is also known for his role as Hisashi Uehara in the Netflix series Good Morning Call.

Filmography

TV series

Films

References

External links
Shunya Shiraishi on Twitter
Shunya Shiraishi blog on Tumblr
Shunya Shiraishi on Instagram

1990 births
Living people
21st-century Japanese male actors
Kamen Rider